Mumbar is a village in the Punjab province of Pakistan. It is located at 32°59'10N 73°49'10E with an altitude of 229 metres (754 feet).

References

Villages in Punjab, Pakistan